Joseph Jackson (born March 18, 1976) is a former American football linebacker who played two seasons with the Arizona Rattlers of the Arena Football League. He played college football at San Diego State University. He was also a member of the Toronto Argonauts of the Canadian Football League.

Professional career
Jackson played in seven games for the Toronto Argonauts in 2001. He was signed to the Arizona Rattlers' practice squad on July 3, 2002. He re-signed with the Rattlers on November 21, 2002.

References

External links
 Just Sports Stats
 College stats

Living people
1976 births
Players of American football from Arizona
American football linebackers
American football fullbacks
Canadian football linebackers
African-American players of American football
African-American players of Canadian football
San Diego State Aztecs football players
Toronto Argonauts players
Arizona Rattlers players
Sportspeople from Tempe, Arizona
21st-century African-American sportspeople
20th-century African-American sportspeople